Andrew Kandrevas is a Democratic member of the Michigan House of Representatives, representing the 13th district. Prior to his service in the legislature, Kandrevas served as president of the Southgate City Council and as a prosecutor for Wayne County.

References

External links
 
Legislative website
Twitter account

Living people
Democratic Party members of the Michigan House of Representatives
Michigan city council members
People from Southgate, Michigan
University of Michigan alumni
Wayne State University Law School alumni
Year of birth missing (living people)